Leshnicë e Sipërme (Ano Lesinitsa) is a village in the Vlorë County in Albania near the Greek-Albanian border. At the 2015 local government reform it became part of the municipality Finiq. It is inhabited solely by Greeks.

Notable people
Nikos Katsalidas (Niko Kacalidha, b. 1949), poet and founding member of the organization of the Greek minority, Omonoia.

Nearest places
Leshnicë e Poshtme
Cerkovicë
Maliçan
Shëndre
Dhrovjan
Kërrë
Tsamantas (Greece)

References

External links
Some recent photos from the village:
Panoramio - Photo of Ano Lesinitsa - Northern Epirus
Panoramio - Photo of Pano Leshnica
Panoramio - Photo of Agios Georgios. Pano Leshnica.

Greek communities in Albania
Populated places in Finiq
Villages in Vlorë County